Harold William Frost (1874 – 5 September 1950) was a New Zealand bowls player who represented his country at the 1930 British Empire Games.

Early life and family
Born in 1874 at Birkenhead, Cheshire, England, Frost emigrated to New Zealand with his family when he was seven years old. He studied at the University of Otago and the University of Pennsylvania, becoming a dentist. He began practising in Napier, where he married Florence Gruchy at Napier Cathedral on 9 June 1898. The couple went on to have four children. Frost lived in Wellington for about 20 years, before moving to Auckland in about 1928.

Lawn bowls
A member of the Carlton Bowling Club, Frost represented New Zealand at the 1930 British Empire Games in Hamilton, Ontario, in the fours.  The foursome of Frost, William Fielding, Peter McWhannell and Edward Leach finished fifth.

Death
Frost died in Auckland on 5 September 1950.

References

1874 births
1950 deaths
People from Birkenhead
English emigrants to New Zealand
University of Otago alumni
University of Pennsylvania alumni
New Zealand dentists
New Zealand male bowls players
Commonwealth Games competitors for New Zealand
Bowls players at the 1930 British Empire Games